Acrobelione langi is a species of isopod in the genus Acrobelione.

References

Crustaceans described in 1920
Cymothoida